Jacob "Gurrah" Shapiro (May 5, 1899 – June 9, 1947) was a New York mobster who, with his partner Louis "Lepke" Buchalter, controlled industrial labor racketeering in New York for two decades and established the Murder, Inc. organization.

Early years
Shapiro was born in 1899 in Minsk in the Russian Empire. While confined in protectory in Brooklyn, he became friends with Joseph Valachi and Jimmy "The Shiv" DeStefano (who got his nickname while confined in the protectory). Legs Diamond was also there but kept his distance from the feared threesome. During this period, Shapiro encountered his future partner, Louis "Lepke" Buchalter; both boys were attempting to rob the same pushcart. Instead of fighting over the spoils, Shapiro and Buchalter agreed on a partnership. Buchalter served as the brains and Shapiro provided the muscle in an alliance that lasted for decades. Shapiro and Buchalter soon became  acquainted with future mobsters Meyer Lansky and Lucky Luciano, both of whom were protégés of mobster Arnold Rothstein.

Labor slugger
Encouraged by Rothstein, Shapiro and Buchalter entered the lucrative arena of New York labor racketeering working for Jacob Orgen.  Orgen had previously wrested control of this racket from Nathan Kaplan in the decade-long Labor Slugger Wars. The gangsters had infiltrated labor unions in the busy Garment District, Manhattan, assaulting and murdering the union leadership to gain control. The gangsters then instituted a system of kickbacks and skimming from union dues while at the same time extorting the garment manufacturers with the threat of strikes.

After working for Orgen for a while, Shapiro and Buchalter started planning to take over his operations. Realizing that Shapiro and Buchalter posed a threat, Orgen allied himself with brothers Eddie and Jack "Legs" Diamond.

Shapiro and Buchalter soon made their move. On October 15, 1927, Orgen and Jack Diamond were standing on the corner of Delancey and Norfolk Street in the Lower East Side. Two gunmen (thought to be Shapiro and Buchalter) drove up to the corner. One gunman got out of the car and started shooting while the driver began shooting from inside the car. Orgen was killed instantly and Jack Diamond was severely wounded. With Orgen's death, Shapiro and Buchalter took over his labor racketeering operation. The two partners soon began massive extortions of both labor unions and businesses as they created a massive criminal monopoly in the Garment District.

Murder, Inc.
Although the pair are thought to have started Murder Inc., the enterprise was already thriving when the pair became one of their top clients next to the "National Crime Syndicate", a confederation of crime families created by Luciano and Lansky in 1929. The Syndicate was created to avoid the bloody gang wars of the 1920s by creating an organization with the power to mediate organized crime disputes and punish offenders. Murder, Inc. served as the enforcement arm of the Syndicate.

Government pressure

During the early 1930s, US Attorney Thomas E. Dewey started to prosecute organized crime members in New York City.  The pressure created by Dewey was such that in 1935 mobster Dutch Schultz asked the National Crime Syndicate to approve Dewey's murder. Shapiro and Anastasia agreed with Schultz, but Buchalter and the rest of the Syndicate turned down his request. Killing a prosecutor went against mob tradition, the majority argued, and would only increase federal investigation into organized crime and possibly expose the Syndicate itself.  In fact, the Syndicate was so fearful of Schultz's proposal that they later ordered Buchalter to murder Schultz.  On October 23, 1935, Schultz and several associates were gunned down by Murder, Inc. gunmen in a restaurant in Newark, New Jersey.

Shortly after Schultz's death, Shapiro and Buchalter became the focus of Dewey's investigations. In October, 1936, Shapiro and Buchalter were convicted under the terms of the Sherman Anti-Trust Act and were both sentenced to two years in Sing Sing Prison. After his conviction, Shapiro went into hiding for a year. However, he finally turned himself in to Federal Bureau of Investigation (FBI) agents on April 14, 1938 and was sent to prison. On May 5, 1944, Shapiro was convicted of conspiracy and extortion and sentenced to 15 years to life in prison.

Months before his 1944 conviction, Shapiro allegedly smuggled a note to Buchalter, who was then on trial in New York for murder. The note simply read, "I told you so."  On March 4, 1944, Buchalter was electrocuted in Sing Sing Prison in Ossining, New York.  Until his death Shapiro remained in prison and died from a heart attack in 1947. Shapiro remained convinced that had Dewey been killed, he and others would have remained free.

References
Asbury, Herbert. The Gangs of New York. New York: Alfred A. Knopf, 1928. 
Kelly, Robert J. Encyclopedia of Organized Crime in the United States. Westport, Connecticut: Greenwood Press, 2000. 
Sifakis, Carl. The Mafia Encyclopedia. New York: Da Capo Press, 2005. 
Sifakis, Carl. The Encyclopedia of American Crime. New York: Facts on File Inc., 2001.

Further reading
Block, Alan A. East Side-West Side: Organizing Crime in New York, 1930–1950. New Brunswick, New Jersey: Transaction Publishers 1983. 
Ellis, Edward Robb. The Epic Of New York City: A Narrative History. New York: Carroll & Graf Publishers, 2005. 
Fried, Albert. The Rise and Fall of the Jewish Gangster in America. New York: Holt, Rinehart and Winston, 1980. 
Katcher, Leo. The Big Bankroll: The Life and Times of Arnold Rothstein. New York: Da Capo Press, 1994. 
Jacobs, James B., Christopher Panarella and Jay Worthington. Busting the Mob: The United States Vs. Cosa Nostra. New York: NYU Press, 1994. 
O'Kane, James M. The Crooked Ladder: Gangsters, Ethnicity and the American Dream. New Brunswick, New Jersey: Transaction Publishers, 1994. 
Peterson, Robert W. Crime & the American Response. New York: Facts on File, 1973. 
Pietrusza, David. Rothstein: The Life, Times, and Murder of the Criminal Genius Who Fixed the 1919 World Series. New York: Carroll & Graf Publishers, 2003. 
Reppetto, Thomas A. American Mafia: A History of Its Rise to Power. New York: Henry Holt & Co., 2004. 
Sorin, Gerald. The Nurturing Neighborhood: The Brownsville Boys' Club and Jewish Community in Urban America, 1940–1990. New York: NYU Press, 1992. 
Cohen, Rich. Tough Jews: Fathers, Sons, and Gangster Dreams. New York: Simon & Schuster, 1998. 
Almog, Oz,  Kosher Nostra Jüdische Gangster in Amerika, 1890–1980 ; Jüdischen Museum der Stadt Wien ; 2003, Text Oz Almog, Erich Metz,

External links
 
Federal Bureau of Investigation – Famous Cases: The Fur Dressers Case

MugShots.com – Jacob Shapiro  

Jewish American gangsters
American crime bosses
Murder, Inc.
American people who died in prison custody
Prisoners who died in United States federal government detention
Emigrants from the Russian Empire to the United States
1899 births
1947 deaths
Prohibition-era gangsters
People from Odesa
Organized crime people
20th-century American Jews